Tabaá Zapotec (Central Villa Alta Zapotec) is a Zapotec language of San Juan Tabaá, Oaxaca, Mexico.

References

Zapotec languages